Dwight Benton (New York City, September 9, 1834 – April 7, 1903) was an American painter and writer, who resided for decades in Rome.

He learned painting in the United States, painting landscapes and cityscapes of the midwest. He became an expatriate and painted watercolor landscapes, including of the Protestant Cemetery in Rome, but also vedute of the Sabina, or the areas around Olevano and Subiaco. He also painted Veduta dell'Isola di Capri. he published a journal entitled The Roman World.

References

1834 births
1903 deaths
19th-century American painters
American male painters
20th-century American painters
19th-century Italian painters
Italian male painters
20th-century Italian painters
American expatriates in Italy
19th-century Italian male artists
19th-century American male artists
20th-century American male artists
20th-century Italian male artists